Dobai or Dobay may refer to:

Hungarian surname
 Ştefan Dobay (1909–1994), Hungarian-Romanian footballer
 Karol Dobay (1928–1982), Slovak football striker
 Gyula Dobay (1937–2007), Hungarian swimmer
 Dobay family, Hungarian nobility

See also
Dwivedi or Dobay, Dube; an Indian Brahmin surname

Hungarian-language surnames